Fort Michilimackinac was an 18th-century French, and later British, fort and trading post at the Straits of Mackinac; it was built on the northern tip of the lower peninsula of the present-day state of Michigan in the United States. Built around 1715, and abandoned in 1783, it was located along the Straits, which connect Lake Huron and Lake Michigan of the Great Lakes of North America. 

The present-day village of Mackinaw City developed around the site of the fort, which has been designated as a National Historic Landmark. It is preserved as an open-air historical museum, with several reconstructed wooden buildings and palisade, and is now part of Fort Michilimackinac State Park.

History

The primary purpose of the fort was as part of the French-Canadian trading post system, which stretched from the Atlantic Coast and the St. Lawrence River to the Great Lakes, and south to the Mississippi River through the Illinois Country. The fort served as a supply depot for traders in the western Great Lakes.

The French had first established a presence in the Straits of Mackinac in 1671 when Father Marquette established the Jesuit St. Ignace Mission at present-day St. Ignace in the Upper Peninsula of Michigan. In 1683, they augmented the mission with Fort de Buade. In 1701, Sieur de Cadillac moved the French garrison to Fort Detroit and closed the mission.

By 1713, however, the French decided to re-establish a presence along the Straits of Mackinac, and built the wooden Fort Michilimackinac on the northern tip of the lower peninsula. They sent Constant le Marchand de Lignery with a contingent of soldiers and workmen in 1715 to accomplish the job. Over the decades, they made several modifications and expansions to the palisade walls. Chevalier Jacques Testard de Montigny, who was a Lt. and a Knight of the Order of St. Louis, was appointed in 1730 and served for three years as commandant of the fort. He was previously commandant of Fort La Baye (Green Bay, Wisconsin).  Many of his relatives settled in Michigan.

The French relinquished the fort, along with their territory in Canada, to the British in 1761 following their defeat in the French and Indian War, the North American front of the Seven Years' War. The British continued to operate the fort as a major trading post, but most residents were French and Métis (Ojibwe-French), who spoke predominantly French and worshipped at Sainte Anne Church in a small log structure.  Other civilian residents included British fur traders, some of whom resided within the fort in the southeastern row house.

The Ojibwe in the region soon became dissatisfied with British policies, particularly their cancellation of the annual policy of distributing gifts to the Indians. On June 2, 1763, as part of the larger conflict known as Pontiac's War, a group of Ojibwe staged a game of baaga'adowe (a forerunner of modern lacrosse) outside the fort as a ruse to gain entrance. After entering the fort, they killed most of the British inhabitants. They held the fort for a year before the British regained control, promising to offer more and better gifts to the native inhabitants of the area.

The British eventually determined that the wooden fort on the mainland was too vulnerable. In 1781 they built a limestone fort on nearby Mackinac Island.  Now known as Fort Mackinac, it was initially named Fort Michilimackinac. The British then moved related buildings to the island by dismantling them and moving them across the water in the summer and over ice in winter to the island during the next two years. Ste. Anne's Church was also moved. Patrick Sinclair, the lieutenant governor of Michilimackinac, ordered the remains of the original Fort Michilimackinac to be burned after the move.

Today

In 1960 the fort grounds were designated a National Historic Landmark. The grounds were then restored, largely through archaeologically-informed reconstruction, as a tourist attraction.  The fort and grounds operate, as of 2022, as part of Colonial Michilimackinac State Park in Mackinaw City, a major component of the Mackinac State Historic Parks. Interpreters, both paid and volunteer, help bring the history to life with music, live demonstrations and reenactments, including musket and cannon firing demonstrations.  The site has numerous reconstructed historical wooden structures based on archeological excavations. This is considered one of the most extensively excavated early colonial French archaeological sites in the United States.

The State Park grounds, adjacent to the fort, also contain other resources.  The grounds feature the foot of the Mackinac Bridge, the Old Mackinac Point Light (a 1892 lighthouse), a day-use park with a view of the Mackinac Bridge and Mackinac Island, and a visitor center with gift shop.

See also

Banknote of Fort Michilmackinac
List of National Historic Landmarks in Michigan
National Register of Historic Places listings in Emmet County, Michigan

References

Further reading
Farmer, Silas. (1884) (Jul 1969) The History of Detroit and Michigan, or, The Metropolis Illustrated: A Chronological Cyclopaedia of the Past and Present: including a full record of territorial days in Michigan, and the annuals of Wayne County, in various formats at Open Library.

External links

Colonial Michilimackinac official site
Visiting Colonial Fort Michilimackinac
Michigan Historical Markers: Fort Michilimackinac
Fort Michilimackinac Pageant
Marriage records and 1741 drawing of Fort Michilimackinac
Michigan.gov: Fort Michilimackinac
Video documentary on Michilimackinac
Michilimackinac.com Michilimackinac – A short history of the word.

Michilimackinac
Michilimackinac
Living museums in Michigan
Military and war museums in Michigan
Museums in Emmet County, Michigan
1715 establishments in New France
French-American culture in Michigan
Archaeological sites on the National Register of Historic Places in Michigan
Michilimackinac
Michigan State Historic Sites
National Historic Landmarks in Michigan
National Register of Historic Places in Emmet County, Michigan
Tourist attractions in Emmet County, Michigan
1783 disestablishments in the British Empire
Military installations established in 1715
Military installations closed in 1783
Trading posts in the United States